Lelle is a small borough in Kehtna Parish, Rapla County, in central Estonia. It has a station on the Tallinn - Viljandi railway line operated by Elron, and until December 2018 was the junction with the former branch to Pärnu. As of 2011 Census, the settlement's population was 339.

Lelle Manor was first mentioned in 1559.

See also
Lelle SK
FC Lelle

References

External links
Lelle Manor at Estonian Manors Portal

Boroughs and small boroughs in Estonia
Kreis Pernau